Ravda Peak is a rocky peak of elevation  in Levski Ridge, Tangra Mountains, Livingston Island in the South Shetland Islands, Antarctica.  Situated on the side ridge projecting northwards from Levski Peak into Huron Glacier.  The peak was first ascended by the Bulgarian Lyubomir Ivanov from Camp Academia on 21 December 2004.

The peak is named after the Black Sea settlement of Ravda, Bulgaria.

Location

Maps
 L.L. Ivanov et al. Antarctica: Livingston Island and Greenwich Island, South Shetland Islands. Scale 1:100000 topographic map. Sofia: Antarctic Place-names Commission of Bulgaria, 2005.
 L.L. Ivanov. Antarctica: Livingston Island and Greenwich, Robert, Snow and Smith Islands. Scale 1:120000 topographic map.  Troyan: Manfred Wörner Foundation, 2009.  
 Antarctic Digital Database (ADD). Scale 1:250000 topographic map of Antarctica. Scientific Committee on Antarctic Research (SCAR). Since 1993, regularly upgraded and updated.
 L.L. Ivanov. Antarctica: Livingston Island and Smith Island. Scale 1:100000 topographic map. Manfred Wörner Foundation, 2017.

References
 Ravda Peak. SCAR Composite Antarctic Gazetteer
 Bulgarian Antarctic Gazetteer. Antarctic Place-names Commission. (details in Bulgarian, basic data in English)

External links
 Ravda Peak. Copernix satellite image

Tangra Mountains